Coddle (sometimes Dublin coddle) is an Irish dish which is often made to use up leftovers. It most commonly consists of layers of roughly sliced pork sausages and rashers (thinly sliced, somewhat-fatty back bacon) with chunky potatoes, sliced onion, salt, pepper, and herbs (parsley or chives). Traditionally, it can also include barley.

Coddle is particularly associated with Dublin, the capital of Ireland. It was reputedly a favourite dish of the writers Seán O'Casey and Jonathan Swift, and it appears in several references to Dublin, including the works of James Joyce.

The dish is braised in the stock produced by boiling the pieces of bacon and sausages. The dish is cooked in a pot with a well-fitting lid in order to steam the ingredients left uncovered by the broth. Sometimes raw sliced potato is added, but traditionally it was eaten with bread. The only seasonings are usually salt, pepper, and occasionally parsley.

Etymology
The name comes from the verb coddle, meaning to cook food in water below boiling (see coddled egg), which in turn derives from caudle, which comes from the French term meaning ‘to boil gently, parboil or stew’.

See also
 Colcannon
 List of Irish dishes
 List of potato dishes
 List of sausage dishes

References

External links 
 

Bacon dishes
Culture in Dublin (city)
Irish cuisine
Meat and potatoes dishes
Potato dishes
Sausage dishes